Langsa Timur is a district located in the eastern area of Langsa, Aceh, Indonesia. It has one subdistrict (mukim) consisting 16 villages:

 Alue Merbau
 Alue Pineueng
 Alue Pineueng Timue
 Buket Meutuah
 Buket Pulo
 Buket Rata
 Cinta Raja
 Gampong Baro
 Kapa
 Matang Ceungai
 Matang Panyang
 Matang Seutui
 Meudang Ara
 Seuneubok Antara
 Sukarejo
 Sungai Lueng

Districts of Aceh